Baja Malibu is a beach and resort in Tijuana Municipality, Baja California named after the beach town Malibu of Los Angeles County. The beach is a popular tourist area in the San Diego–Tijuana metropolitan region and draws surfers from all over Southern California.

Recreation
There are many resorts and luxury hotels & condominiums lining the beach at Baja Malibu. At the entrance of Baja Malibu is the BM Surf Bar   which offers food, drink, pool, sports viewing and live music. The bar also offers paid parking for surfers.

Waves
The waves at BM are of the beach-break variety and break from the right and left. The bottom at BM is sandy and the waves at the beach are very consistent. The waves are very fast, powerful, and recommended for intermediate to expert surfers. Even though Baja Malibu is on the Gold Coast of Baja California, and therefore south of the South Coast Beaches of Southern California, the water is on average colder than the northern beaches.

See also
 Playas de Tijuana
 Baja Mar

References

External links
 Baja Malibu

Seaside resorts in Baja California
Tourist attractions in Baja California